Saneyoshi (written: 實好 or 実吉) is a Japanese surname. Notable people with the surname include:

, Japanese footballer
, Japanese physician and admiral

Japanese-language surnames